Battle of Starokostiantyniv (July 26–July 28, 1648) was a battle of the Khmelnytsky Uprising. Near the site of the present-day town of Starokostiantyniv in Ukraine, a numerically superior force of Cossacks under the command of Maksym Kryvonis was defeated by the Polish–Lithuanian Commonwealth forces under the command of Jeremi Wiśniowiecki.

References
Władysław Andrzej Serczyk: Na płonącej Ukrainie. Dzieje Kozaczyzny 1648-1651. Warszawa: Książka i Wiedza, 1998. .
Jerzy Bordziłowski (red.): Mała encyklopedia wojskowa. T.1. Warszawa: MON, 1967
Romuald Romański: Wojny kozackie. Warszawa: Bellona, 2005. 
Romuald Romański: Książę Jeremi Wiśniowiecki. Warszawa: Bellona, 2011. 
Zbigniew Wójcik: Dzikie Pola w ogniu. O Kozaczyźnie w dawnej Rzeczypospolitej. Warszawa: Wiedza Powszechna, 1971.

Conflicts in 1648
1648 in Europe
Starokostiantyniv